Reinhard I, Lord of Hanau ( – 20 September 1281; first mentioned in 1243) is the ancestor of the House of Hanau.

Background 
With Reinhard I the closed genealogy of the Lords and Counts of Hanau begins. He belongs to a family that was initially named after their ancestral Dorfelden Castle. They were first mentioned in a document in 1166/1168. From 1191, the family styled itself "Lords of Hanau". Their relationship, if any, with the earlier Lords of Buchen or the Lords of Dorfelden who ruled in the Hanau area before 1166, is not entirely clear.

Life 
Reinhard I was probably the son of Reinhard II of Dorfelden. Around 1243, he succeeded his uncle Henry II of Dorfelden as Lord, and reunited the possessions of his family in a single hand.

In 1260 Reinhard I accompanied his cousin Werner of Eppstein to Rome ("defying great hardships and dangers"), where Werner was consecrated as Prince-Archbishop of Mainz. As a reward, he received the post of Burgmann of Aschaffenburg, which was a completed fief after the death of Cornrad of Dornburg.

He actively participated in the politics of the noble houses surrounding him. In 1260, he was involved in a feud in the Spessart area. In 1265, a Public Peace was concluded by Reinhard I, the House of Hesse and other nobles in the Wetterau area. In a dispute between the Archbishopric of Mainz and the counts of Rieneck about power in the western Spessart, he stood on the side of the archbishop. This conflict lasted until 1271 and was finally won by Werner of Eppstein, who was still archbishop of Mainz. As part of the settlement, Elisabeth, the daughter of Count Louis III of Rienck, married below her station, to Reinhard I's son Ulrich I, bringing a rich dowry, which included the town of Steinau an der Straße. The Lords of Hanau, proud of gaining in status, created a coat of arms resembling the arms of Rieneck.

In 1266, Reinhard I reached an agreement with the city of Frankfurt, in which he and his heirs would receive a very high monetary compensation, if one of their subjects were to become a citizen of Frankfurt. This suggests, he was struggling with large numbers of subjects migrating to Frankfurt.

Reinhard I was from 1275 to 1279 Imperial Landvogt in the Wetterau area, and Burgrave of Friedberg. He was also Burgmann of the Kaiserpfalz Gelnhausen and of Rödelheim.

During his reign, Reinhard I managed to extend his territory. In 1255, his brother-in-law Ulrich II, Lord of Münzenberg died without a male heir. Reinhard's wife, Adelaide inherited a share of 1/6 of the Münzenberg Inheritance. In 1277, he inherited the district of Schwarzenfels from the Rieneck inheritance. He rounded off his territory by exchanging the manors in Benstadt, Stierstadt and Ossenheim with the Mariengreden chapter in Mainz for the forests of Hanau and Bulau.

Death 
He died on 20 September 1281 and was buried in Arnsburg Abbey.

Marriage and issue 
In 1245, he married Adelaide, a daughter of Ulrich I of Münzenberg. As her dowry, she brought the district of Babenhausen into the marriage. They had four children:
 Ulrich I
 Reinhard, mentioned from 1292 until 1301, most recently as canon of Würzburg
 Adelaide, abbess of Patershausen Abbey
 Isengard, married Gerhard of Weilnau after 1265, died before 1281

References 
 Reinhard Dietrich: Die Landesverfassung in dem Hanauischen, in: Hanauer Geschichtsblätter, vol. 34, Hanau 1996, 
 Fred Schwind: Die Landvogtei in der Wetterau, thesis, Frankfurt, 1972
 Fred Schwind: Zu den Anfängen der Herrschaft und Stadt Hanau, in: 675 Jahre Altstadt Hanau, Hanau 1978, p. 24 ff
 Reinhard Suchier: Genealogie des Hanauer Grafenhauses, in: Festschrift des Hanauer Geschichtsvereins zu seiner fünfzigjährigen Jubelfeier am 27. August 1894, Hanau, 1894
 Ernst J. Zimmermann: Hanau Stadt und Land 3rd, ed., Hanau, 1919, reprinted: 1978,

Footnotes 

Lords of Hanau
Main-Kinzig-Kreis
People from Wetteraukreis
1220s births
1281 deaths
13th-century German nobility

Year of birth uncertain